Events from the year 1536 in art.

Events
Piazza di Venezia opened in Rome.
Hans Holbein the Younger is employed as King's Painter to Henry VIII of England by this date.

Works

 Bramantino – The Flight into Egypt (Madonna del Sasso, Switzerland)
 Jean Clouet – Portrait of Guillaume Budé
 Hans Holbein (approximate date)
 Portrait of Henry VIII
 Portrait Miniature of Margaret Roper (approximate date)
 Giulio Romano – Tarquin and Lucretia'
 Titian – La Belle Jan Sanders van Hemessen – The Prodigal SonBirths
 Bernardo Buontalenti, Italian stage designer, architect, theatrical designer, military engineer and artist (died 1608)
 Vincenzo Campi, Italian painter of the Renaissance (died 1591)
 Sebastiano Filippi, Italian late Renaissance-Mannerist painter of the School of Ferrara (died 1602)
 Maso da San Friano, Italian painter active in Florence (died 1571)
 Santi di Tito, Italian painter of Late-Mannerist or proto-Baroque style (died 1602/1603)
 Teodoro Ghisi, Italian engraver (died 1601)
 Ottaviano Nonni, Italian architect, sculptor, and painter (died 1606)
 Barthélemy Prieur, French sculptor (died 1611)
 Siyâvash, Iranian illustrator of Georgian origin known for his miniatures (died 1616)
 Domenico Vitus, Italian engraver (died unknown'')

Deaths
 Michele da Verona, Italian painter of the Renaissance period (born 1470)
 Antonello Gagini, Italian sculptor of the High Renaissance (born 1478)
 Baldassare Peruzzi, Italian architect and painter (born 1481)
 Pedro Romana, Spanish Renaissance painter (born 1460)
 Hans Weiditz, German Renaissance woodcut artist (born 1495)

 
Years of the 16th century in art